The , also known as Toyota Tecno Museum, is a technology museum located in Nishi-ku in the city of Nagoya, central Japan.

History 
Toyota started as a textile firm and evolved over decades into an international automobile producer. Its display starts with textile looms and then gradually goes over into the history of cars. Also featured are high-tech robots.

Access by public transport is Sako Station on the Meitetsu line or Kamejima Station by the Higashiyama Line.

Images

See also
 Toyota Automobile Museum

External links 

 Homepage of the Toyota Museum of Industry and Technology
 Google Virtual Gallery Tour

Toyota
Nishi-ku, Nagoya
Museums in Nagoya
Technology museums
Industry museums in Japan
Science museums in Japan
Museums established in 1994
1994 establishments in Japan